Isabella is a 1988 Malayalam–language romantic drama film, directed by Mohan and starring Sumalatha in the lead, who played Isabella, a tour guide. It also stars Balachandra Menon, Nedumudi Venu, etc. The film contains evergreen love songs which are still topping charts.

Plot
Sumalatha plays the title role of Isabella, a tour guide, who falls in love with Unnikrishnan (Balachandra Menon), one of her customers. Unni has spent all his Singapore earned wealth for the wellbeing of his sister and family and a bachelor even in his 40s. She has several family problems as her father (Alby) is dead, her mother (Maggy) has become a drunkard and her brother (Tony) is autistic. She has to be the sole breadwinner of her family.  Nedumudi Venu was her mentor and well-wisher, who introduced her to Unnikrishnan.

After that season, Unni returned to his residence and Isabella, whom he called affectionately Bella, awaited for his return. He returned on several seasons, but each time he refused to accept her as his life-partner. Terribly disappointed by his family's money-centric behaviour, Unnikrishnan decides to spend his remaining life with Bella. But on reaching there, he has a painful surprise waiting for him. Bella, fed up with the agony of solitude, family problems and abandonment, decides to exit from life. Unni knows the saddest news from her mentor, her only well-wisher and Unni picks his crutches once again which he threw away in hope of reunion with Bella, and leaves for his lone journey remaining and visuals fade to scrolling last cards.

Cast
Sumalatha as Isabella
Balachandra Menon as Unnikrishna Menon
Nedumudi Venu as a Tourist Guide
Anand Mahadevan as Ananthu 
Ajay Menon as the receptionist
Vettukili Prakash as Tony 
K. P. A. C. Sunny as Alby
Asha Jayaram as Devi
Valsala Menon
Nanditha Bose
Jayalalita

Soundtrack
The music was composed by Johnson and the lyrics were written by O. N. V. Kurup. The song "Isabella..." has turned to a cult song and remains top rated even among today's younger generation.

References

External links

see the film
 isaballa (malayalam film)

1988 films
1980s Malayalam-language films
1988 romantic drama films
Films directed by Mohan
Indian romantic drama films
Films scored by Johnson